The  are a mountain range in the Tōhoku region of Honshū, Japan. The highest point in the range is Mount Iwate, .

The range includes several widely known mountains: Hakkōda Mountains, Mount Iwate, Mount Zaō, Mount Azuma, Mount Yakeishi, and Mount Adatara.

Naming
These mountains previously formed the boundary between historical provinces of Mutsu (陸奥国) and Dewa (出羽国). The kanji for the name of the mountain range was created from one kanji of the two provinces, 奥 and 羽, respectively.

Geology
The Ōu Mountains began to form in the Pliocene. They sit over the middle of the inner arc of the Northeastern Japan Arc. This is the result of the Pacific Plate subducting under the Okhotsk Plate. A chain of Quaternary volcanoes along the range forms the volcanic front.

References

Mountain ranges of Akita Prefecture
Mountain ranges of Aomori Prefecture
Mountain ranges of Iwate Prefecture
Mountain ranges of Miyagi Prefecture
Mountain ranges of Yamagata Prefecture
Mountain ranges of Fukushima Prefecture